Ninam may refer to:
 Ninam language a language of Brazil and Venezuela
Ninam, Satara, a village in Maharashtra, India